Phrom Phiram may refer to:
 Phrom Phiram District
 Phrom Phiram Subdistrict